Harold A. Dorschug (March 29, 1913 – September 13, 1999) was one of the master control engineers during The Mercury Theatre on the Air broadcast of H. G. Wells' The War of the Worlds on CBS radio in October 1938.  Later, he moved to West Hartford, CT and was Chief Engineer and Director of Research and Development of WTIC radio and Channel 3 television in Hartford, Connecticut for many years.  He was a very generous gentleman and helped put many of the Hartford area educational stations on the air on a pro bono basis, including WQTQ at Weaver High School and WWUH at the University of Hartford. In 1975 he built and licensed WJMJ, the station in Bloomfield, CT licensed to St. Thomas Seminary. Dorschug died September 13, 1999.

He was an amateur radio operator starting at age 16, and then studied electrical engineering at Syracuse University. He served in the U.S. Navy in World War II. After the war, he was chief engineer at WEEI in Boston and taught radio and television courses at Boston University.

Bibliography
 The Good Old Days of Radio Broadcast Engineering (1971)

Trivia
His amateur radio call signs were W1AST and W8AST

References

External links
 Obituary and photograph 
 Obituary at WTIC Alumni Site
 History of WWUH
 WTIC Alumni Web Site
 Famous Hams

20th-century American engineers
Syracuse University College of Engineering and Computer Science alumni
Boston University faculty
1913 births
1999 deaths
Amateur radio people